Bukaar Biye-Sungule (ruled c.1492–c.1527) was the tenth ruler, or Burba, of the Jolof Empire.

References

15th-century monarchs in Africa
16th-century monarchs in Africa
Year of birth missing
1527 deaths